Quebec East (also known as Québec-Est  and Québec East) was a federal electoral district in Quebec, Canada, that was represented in the House of Commons of Canada from 1867 to 2004.

While its boundaries changed over the decades, it was essentially made up of the eastern part of Quebec City and was largely of working class composition. It was created in 1867.  It was renamed "Québec-Est" in 1966, and "Québec East" in 1996.  It was abolished through redistribution 2003 into the ridings of Québec, Louis-Saint-Laurent, and Beauport.

From 1877 to 1958, the riding was held by just three Members of Parliament (MPs)–Prime Minister Sir Wilfrid Laurier (1877 – 1919), senior Cabinet member Ernest Lapointe (1919 – 1941) and Prime Minister Louis St. Laurent (1942 – 1958).

Members of Parliament
This riding has elected the following Members of Parliament:

Election results

Quebec East

|Canadian Party
|Paul Bouchard
|align=right|12,768

Québec-Est

Québec East

See also 

 List of Canadian federal electoral districts
 Past Canadian electoral districts

External links

Riding history from the] Library of Parliament:
http://www2.parl.gc.ca/Sites/LOP/HFER/hfer.asp?Language=E&Search=Det&rid=581&Include= Quebec East 1867-1966]
Québec-Est 1966-1996
Québec East 1996-present

Former federal electoral districts of Quebec